Serhiy Hrynevetsky is a Ukrainian politician who served as the Governor of Odesa Oblast, first from 1998 to 2005, and again from 27 November 2020 to 1 March 2022 following his appointment by President Volodymyr Zelensky. Zelensky dismissed him on the seventh day of the 2022 Russian invasion of Ukraine.

Hrynevetsky was a member of the Verkhovna Rada in the 6th and 7th convocations.

Biography

Early life and education
Serhiy Hrynevetsky was born on 25 September 1957 in Luzhanka, Tarutyne Raion, in Odesa Oblast, then part of the Ukrainian Soviet Socialist Republic in the Soviet Union. Hrynevetsky graduated from the Odesa Technological Institute of Refrigeration on 26 June 1979. On 27 February 1985, Hrynevetsky graduated from the Ukrainian Order of the Red Banner of Labor Agricultural Academy. He was educated as a mechanical engineer.

Career in Soviet Ukraine
He then worked as a technological engineer at the Rodzdilnianski district repair shop until 1980. The same year, he took the position as a senior engineer, which he would hold until 1989. From 1982-1984, Hrynevetsky the First Secretary of the Rozdilnianski district committee of the Leninist Communist League of the Youth of Ukraine of Odesa Oblast. From 1984-1986, he served as the Second Secretary as the LCLY of Ukraine.

From 1986-1990, he served as the First Secretary of the Odesa Regional Committee of the Young Communist League of Ukraine. From 1990-1991, he went back to Rozdilnianski district as the regional secretary of the Communist Party of Ukraine, Odesa Oblast.

Personal life
Hrynevetsky speaks both Ukrainian and Russian, the latter of which is his second language. He currently resides in Odesa.

References

External links

 Official website
 Serhiy Hrynevetsky' profile at the official web site of Verkhovna Rada

Governors of Odesa Oblast
Third convocation members of the Verkhovna Rada
Sixth convocation members of the Verkhovna Rada
1957 births
Living people
Seventh convocation members of the Verkhovna Rada